Kačji Dol is a settlement in the Municipality of Rogaška Slatina in eastern Slovenia. The area belongs to the traditional region of Styria. It is now included in the Savinja Statistical Region.

References

External links
Kačji Dol on Geopedia

Populated places in the Municipality of Rogaška Slatina